Sumay-ye Beradust District is in Urmia County, West Azerbaijan province, Iran. At the 2006 National Census, its population was 39,802 in 6,760 households. The following census in 2011 counted 36,216 people in 7,721 households. At the latest census in 2016, the district had 35,183 inhabitants in 7,831 households.

References 

Urmia County

Districts of West Azerbaijan Province

Populated places in West Azerbaijan Province

Populated places in Urmia County